Turan is an ethnic and geographic term referring to certain areas and peoples of Central Asia.

Turan may also refer to:

Places
 Turan (Baluchistan), a medieval region in Pakistan
 Turan (satrapy), a satrapy of the Sassanid Empire
 Turan, a town in the Drenovë Municipality of southeastern Albania
 Turan, Azerbaijan, a village in Shaki Rayon
 Turan, Iran (disambiguation), places in Iran
 Tur'an, a local council in the North District of Israel
 Turan, Russia, several inhabited localities in Russia
 Turan Range, a mountain range in Russia
 Turan Depression, a desert basin along the Caspian Sea stretching from southern Turkmenistan through Uzbekistan to Kazakhstan
 Turan, alternative name of Fort Terán, a former settlement in Texas, United States

People
 Turan (name), a list of people with the given name or surname
 Turan, alternative name of Toran (Pashtun tribe), a tribe in Afghanistan

Arts and entertainment
 Turan ensemble, a Kazakh folk music band
 Turan (Conan), a nation in the fictional world of Conan the Barbarian
 Turan Kingdom, a kingdom in Last Exile, a Japanese animated television series

Businesses
 Turan Air, an Azerbaijani airline
 Turan Corporation, the first company to specialize in Turkish and emerging-market debt
 Turan Information Agency, a news agency based in Baku, Azerbaijan

Other uses
 Turan (mythology), a Etruscan goddess, roughly equivalent to the Greek Aphrodite and the Roman Venus
 Turán (periodical), a Hungarian journal
 40M Turán I, a Hungarian tank of World War II
 Turan Tovuz, an Azerbaijani football club based in Tovuz
 FC Turan, a Kazakhstani football club
 Turan University, a private university in Almaty, Kazakhstan
 Turan railway station, a commuter rail station in İzmir, Turkey

See also
 Turanism, a political movement
 Curse of Turan, a Hungarian superstition
 Turán graph, a mathematical graph
 Tourane, former name of Đà Nẵng, a port city in Vietnam
 Toran (disambiguation)
 Touran (disambiguation)